Sara Twete (born 28 June 1989 in Hillerod, Denmark) is a Danish former figure skater. She is the 2007 Danish junior national champion. She is a three time competitor at the Nordic Championships. Twete was coached by Henrik Walentin, who was a Danish national champion and competed at the World level.

Competitive highlights

 J = Junior Level

External links
 
 Tracings.net profile

Danish female single skaters
Living people
1989 births
Sportspeople from the Capital Region of Denmark